Okhotny Ryad (literally: Hunters' Row) may reference:

 Okhotny Ryad (street), a street in Moscow
 Okhotny Ryad (Moscow Metro)
 Okhotny Ryad (store) under the Manezhnaya Square, Moscow
 State Duma